Sahara (also known as Desert Storm) is a 1995 American-Australian made-for-television action war film shot in Australia and directed by Brian Trenchard-Smith and starring James Belushi. Sahara is a remake of the 1943 film of the same title starring Humphrey Bogart.

Plot
In June 1942, on the eve of the Battle of El Alamein, American Sergeant Joe Gunn (Jim Belushi) and the crew of his M3 Lee tank Lulu Belle are the sole survivors of their unit. Boxed in by the enemy, they have no choice but to head south. They come across a group of Allied stragglers at a destroyed first aid station. The stragglers, led by British doctor Captain Halliday (Jerome Ehlers), decide to ride with Gunn in an attempt to escape the advancing Afrika Korps. Along the way, they pick up first British Sudanese soldier Tambul (Robert Wisdom) and his Italian prisoner, Giuseppe (Angelo D'Angelo), then downed Luftwaffe pilot lieutenant von Schletow (Julian Garner). The group ends up at a deserted Saharan oasis in search of water. With the Germans right behind them, they decide to stay and defend the well, holding up a battalion of 500 Germans.

The well has completely dried up by then. A standoff and battle of wills begins between Gunn and Major von Falken (Alexander Petersons), the German commander. Gunn keeps up the pretense that the well has much water and negotiates to buy time. Eventually, the Germans attack and are beaten off again and again, but one by one, the defenders are killed. During the fighting, von Schletow, the German flyer, tries to escape, injuring Giuseppe who tries to stop him. Giuseppe is then killed by German fire as he tries to alert Gunn. Tambul chases down and kills von Schletow, but is shot as he returns. Before he dies, he tells the others that the Germans did not learn that the well was dry.

When the German commander attempts to resolve the impasse, embittered "Frenchie" Leroux (Michael Massee) meets him outside the fort and kills him, only to be shot down by a sniper while returning to his side. Without a leader, the thirst-maddened Germans' final assault turns into a full-blown surrender as they drop their weapons and claw across the sand towards the well. Gunn discovers, to his shock, that a German shell that exploded in the well has tapped into a source of water. Gunn and Bates (Alan David Lee), the only other Allied survivor, disarm the Germans while they drink their fill. Ultimately, a British Long Range Desert Patrol arrives at the oasis to take charge of the prisoners.

Cast
 Jim Belushi as Sergeant Joe Gunn
 Michael Massee as Corporal Jean "Frenchie" Leroux
 Alan David Lee as Osmond Bates
 Jerome Ehlers as Captain Halliday
 Simon Westaway as Marty Williams
 Mark Lee as Jimmy Doyle
 Robert Wisdom as Sergeant Major Tambul
 Paul Empson as Waco Hoyt
 William Upjohn as Casey
 Todd MacDonald as Mike Clarkson
 Alexander Petersons as Major Hans von Falken 
 Julian Garner as Lieutenant von Schletow
 Angelo D'Angelo as Giuseppe
 Simon Elrahi as Arabian guide
 Claus Dyson as Sergeant Kraus
 David Slingsby as Captain Mueller
 Mark Gerber as Private Bergmann

Production

Development

Director Brian Trenchard-Smith, the son of an Australian officer in the Royal Air Force lived in the UK, but before migrating to Australia, studied filmmaking. Among his 39 movies, five were commissioned by Showtime, including Sahara, the remake of the World War II classic. The film was made on location at Port Stephens, New South Wales, Australia. Some of the German soldiers were played by 130 Royal Australian Air Force (RAAF) and Australian Army personnel.

A Fiat G.59 in Luftwaffe desert camouflage is used in the film. The tank in the film was an original M3 Lee from World War II, but a version supplied to Australia.  It differed from the American version by having the commander cupola with the .30 caliber machine gun removed and the tracks used on British Commonwealth M3 Lee and Grant tanks.

Reception

Critical response
Film historian Alun Evans in Brassey's Guide to War Films, mainly reviewed the earlier 1943 production, but compared and contrasted the two features, noting that the remake had "... sunlight so bright, you need to turn the contrast buttons right down, if you could only say that about the movie."

The New York Times TV reviewer said Belushi "delivers a terrific performance with stunning authority" and the film "proves remarkably effective, bringing us back to a time when good and bad really were quite distinguishable. It's a good yarn, told well once again. And Mr. Belushi's powerful performance could push him to the head of the line on the profitable action-movie circuit."

See also
 List of American films of 1995
 Sahara (1943), the original film
 Nine Men (1943), a similar film about a holdout in the desert

Notes

Citations

Bibliography

 Evans, Alun. Brassey's Guide to War Films. Dulles, Virginia: Potomac Books, 2000. .

References

External links
 
 
 

1995 films
1990s action war films
American action war films
Australian action war films
Films about armoured warfare
Remakes of American films
North African campaign films
Films based on Patrol
Films set in the Sahara
Siege films
American World War II films
Australian World War II films
Films directed by Brian Trenchard-Smith
1990s English-language films
1990s American films